Ulrich Iser (born 14 April 1957) is a paralympic athlete from Germany competing mainly in category F55 throws events.

Iser has competed at three Paralympics.  In 2000 and 2004 he competed in all three throws winning the bronze medal in the shot put in 2000.  He also competed in the shot put in Beijing in the 2008 Summer Paralympics.

References

External links
 

1957 births
Living people
German male shot putters
Wheelchair shot putters
Paralympic shot putters
Paralympic athletes of Germany
Paralympic bronze medalists for Germany
Paralympic medalists in athletics (track and field)
Athletes (track and field) at the 2000 Summer Paralympics
Athletes (track and field) at the 2004 Summer Paralympics
Athletes (track and field) at the 2008 Summer Paralympics
Athletes (track and field) at the 2012 Summer Paralympics
Medalists at the 2000 Summer Paralympics